The Great Northeast Athletic Conference (GNAC) is a collegiate athletic conference affiliated with the National Collegiate Athletic Association (NCAA) Division III.

History

Chronological timeline
 1995 - In 1995, the Great Northeast Athletic Conference (GNAC) was founded. Charter members included the following: On men's sports and women's sports, Albertus Magnus College, Daniel Webster College, Emerson College, Endicott College, Johnson & Wales University, Rhode Island Campus and Rivier College (now Rivier University); on women's sports only, Emmanuel College, Pine Manor College, the University of Saint Joseph, Simmons College (now Simmons University) and Suffolk University, effective beginning the 1995-96 academic year.
 1998 - Norwich University, Southern Vermont College and Western New England College (now Western New England University) joined the GNAC, effective in the 1998-99 academic year.
 1998 - Suffolk's men's sports joined the GNAC, effective in the 1998-99 academic year.
 1999 - Endicott left the GNAC to join the Commonwealth Coast Conference (CCC), effective after the 1998-99 academic year.
 2001 - Emmanuel (Mass.) added men's sports in its athletic program to join the GNAC, effective in the 2001-02 academic year.
 2007 - Western New England left the GNAC to join the CCC, effective after the 2006-07 academic year.
 2007 - Lasell College (now Lasell University) and Mount Ida College and Saint Joseph's College of Maine joined the GNAC, effective in the 2007-08 academic year.
 2008 - Daniel Webster and Southern Vermont left the GNAC to join the New England Collegiate Conference (NECC), effective after the 2007-08 academic year.
 2008 - Four institutions joined the GNAC as associate members: Rhode Island College and the University of Southern Maine for men's golf, and Elms College and Husson University for men's and women's swimming & diving, all effective in the 2008-09 academic year.
 2011 - Anna Maria College joined the GNAC, effective in the 2011-12 academic year.
 2011 - Wentworth Institute of Technology (Wentworth Tech) joined the GNAC as an associate member for men's volleyball, effective in the 2012 spring season (2011-12 academic year).
 2012 - Pine Manor left the GNAC to join the Great South Athletic Conference (GSAC), effective after the 2011-12 academic year.
 2012 - The University of Massachusetts at Darmouth (UMass–Darthmouth) joined the GNAC as an associate member for men's golf, effective in the 2013 spring season (2012-13 academic year).
 2013 - Emerson left the GNAC to join the New England Women's and Men's Athletic Conference (NEWMAC), effective after the 2012-13 academic year.
 2017 - Regis College joined the GNAC, effective in the 2017-18 academic year.
 2018 - Mount Ida left the GNAC due to the school announced that it would close, effective after the 2017-18 academic year.
 2018 - Colby–Sawyer College joined the GNAC, effective in the 2018-19 academic year.
 2018 - Eastern Nazarene College joined the GNAC as an associate member for men's tennis, effective in the 2019 spring season (2018-19 academic year).
 2018 - Saint Joseph (Conn.) added men's sports in its athletic program to join the GNAC, effective in the 2018-19 academic year.
 2020 - Eastern Nazarene left the GNAC as an associate member for men's tennis, effective after the 2020 spring season (2019-20 academic year).
 2020 - Dean College joined the GNAC, effective in the 2020-21 academic year.
 2021 - Elms had upgraded to join the GNAC for all sports, effective in the 2021-22 academic year.
 2021 - The University of New England joined the GNAC as an associate member for women's swimming & diving, effective in the 2021-22 academic year.
 2022 - New England (Me.) left the GNAC as an associate member for women's swimming & diving, effective after the 2021-22 academic year.
 2022 - Mitchell College and New England College both accepted an invitation to the Great Northeast Athletic Conference for the 2023-24 season.

Member schools

Current members 
The GNAC currently has 14 full members, all but one are private schools:

Notes

Future members
The GNAC will have two new full members, also private schools.

Associate members
The GNAC currently has five associate members, all but two are private schools:

Former members
The GNAC had eight former full members, all were private schools:

Notes

Former associate members
The GNAC had two former associate members, which were also private schools:

Membership timeline

Sports

References

External links